Ixopo, also known as Stuartstown, is a town situated on a tributary of the Mkhomazi River along the R56 highway in the midlands of KwaZulu-Natal, South Africa.

Background
The town was laid out in 1878 and named after M Stuart, Resident Magistrate of the surrounding district, who was killed at the Battle of Ingogo in 1881. Its name is derived from the Zulu onomatopoeic word, eXobo, describing the sound made as cattle squelch through mud. The 'x', in Zulu, is pronounced as a lateral click.

The town is most famously described by Alan Paton in the opening lines of Cry, The Beloved Country: "There is a lovely road which runs from Ixopo into the hills. These hills are grass covered and rolling, and they are lovely beyond any singing of it."

Until the mid-1980s, Ixopo was served by a railway station on the  narrow gauge Umzinto - Donnybrook narrow gauge railway.

Notable people 
 Thabo Nodada (Footballer)
 Purity Nomthandazo Malinga (Bishop)
 Ray Zondo (Chief Justice, Constitutional Court of South Africa)

References
3. R56 information Route 56 - Ixopo

Populated places in the Ubuhlebezwe Local Municipality